Hagadone Brook converges with West Kill west of Spruceton, New York. Hagadone Brook drains the northern slopes of North Dome.

References 

Rivers of New York (state)
Rivers of Greene County, New York